NASCAR on CBS was the branding formerly used for broadcasts of NASCAR series races produced by CBS Sports, the sports division of the CBS television network in the United States from 1960 to 2000.

History of coverage

Races covered by CBS

Notes:
 1. The 1998 Pepsi 400 at Daytona was scheduled to be broadcast by CBS, but due to wildfires occurring in the immediate Daytona Beach area, the race was postponed until later in the season, and the broadcast rights were moved to CBS' cable partner, TNN.
 2. The Gatorade 125's were run on Thursday, but CBS would air them via tape-delay on Saturdays before or after the Busch Series race.

Pre-1979
The very first NASCAR races to ever be shown on television were broadcast by CBS. In February 1960, the network sent a "skeleton" production crew to Daytona Beach, Florida and the Daytona International Speedway to cover the Daytona 500's Twin 100 (now the Bluegreen Vacations Duel) qualifying races on February 12, 1960. The production crew also stayed to broadcast portions of the Daytona 500 itself, two days later. The event was hosted by John S. Palmer. CBS would continue to broadcast portions of races for the next 18 years, along with ABC and NBC.

1979 Daytona 500: The breakthrough
CBS Sports president Neal Pilson and motorsports editor Ken Squier believed that America would watch an entire stock car race live on television. Prior to 1979, television coverage of the Daytona 500 either began when the race was halfway over, or as an edited highlight package that aired a week later on ABC's Wide World of Sports. On February 18, 1979, CBS presented the first flag-to-flag coverage of the Daytona 500 (and 500-mile race to be broadcast live on national television in general). The Indianapolis 500 was only broadcast on tape delay that evening in this era; most races were broadcast only through the final quarter to half of the race, as was the procedure for ABC's Championship Car racing broadcasts; with the new CBS contract, the network and NASCAR agreed to a full live broadcast. That telecast introduced in-car and low-level track-side cameras, which has now become standard in all forms of automotive racing broadcasts. The race drew incredible ratings, in part due to the compelling action both on and off the track, and in part because a major snowstorm on the East Coast kept millions of viewers indoors.

1980s

1980 World 600

On May 29, 1980, CBS paid a fee of roughly US$50,000 or $100,000 to Charlotte Motor Speedway to broadcast the World 600 NASCAR stock-car race. Benny Parsons edged out Darrell Waltrip to win a grand prize of $44,850 in a race that was watched by perhaps 3.7 million viewers on the network.

1983 Daytona 500
During its coverage of the 1983 Daytona 500, CBS introduced an innovation which director Bob Fishman helped develop – a miniature, remote-controlled in-car camera called RaceCam. Fishman directed every Daytona 500 telecast on CBS, with the exception of 1992, 1994 and 1998 because Fishman was away directing CBS' figure-skating coverage for the Winter Olympics.

1990s

1990 and 1998 Daytona 500
After years of trying to win it, Dale Earnhardt appeared headed for certain victory in the 1990 Daytona 500 until a series of events in the closing laps. On lap 193, Geoff Bodine spun in the first turn, causing the third and final caution of the race. Everyone pitted except Derrike Cope, who stayed out. On the lap 195 restart, Earnhardt retook and held the lead, only to puncture a tire when he drove over a piece of metal bell housing from the failed engine of Rick Wilson's car on Lap 199. As Earnhardt's damaged car slowed, Cope drove past and earned his first Winston Cup (now NASCAR Cup) victory. It was the first of two victories for the relatively unknown Cope in the 1990 season. In an ironic twist, KIRO-TV, the local CBS affiliate serving Cope's hometown at the time in the Seattle suburb of Spanaway, opted to pre-empt the race to telecast a Seattle SuperSonics basketball game, and the race was delayed until 3:00 p.m. Pacific Time because of the pre-emption.

Earnhardt would eventually win the race in 1998 (under caution), with commentator Mike Joy describing Earnhardt's victory as the "most anticipated moment in the history of motor racing" after his "20 years of trying, 20 years of frustration" of failing to win the race.

1992 Busch Clash and Daytona 500

For one year, Daytona 500 pole qualifying and the Busch Clash swapped days: the Busch Clash was held on Saturday, and qualifying was held Sunday. This move was made at the request of CBS, who wanted the additional time on Sunday for its coverage of the 1992 Winter Olympics.

The network had aired the Busch Clash since it began in 1979. The race debuted on a Sunday, which CBS broadcast live. Pole position qualifying for the Daytona 500 would start Sunday at 10:00 a.m., followed by the Daytona ARCA 200. The Busch Clash would be held after the ARCA race at 3:00 p.m.

1996 DieHard 500

Dale Earnhardt took a horrifying tumble down the front straightaway in "The Big One," after Ernie Irvan got into the side of Sterling Marlin which caused him to hit Earnhardt. After he hit the wall hard, Earnhardt was hit by multiple cars upside down and on the car's side. He ended up breaking his collarbone, and this helped begin a winless streak that spanned the rest of the 1996 season and all of the 1997 season. The race was cut short due to the wreck, and a rainstorm earlier in the race added the factor of darkness, with Jeff Gordon winning. These events helped push the DieHard 500 from the heat, humidity, and almost commonly occurring afternoon thunderstorms of late July to a much cooler, and in the case of the weather, more stable early October date. This was the last Cup race to not be televised live because of the rain delay; the broadcast of the race aired one week later, as an abridged broadcast on CBS.

1998 Craftsman Truck Series

In 1998, a CBS-televised race at Pikes Peak International Raceway in Fountain, Colorado, scheduled for 186 laps ran 12 extra laps (totaling 198) because of multiple attempts at a successful green-white-checkered finish.

1999 Daytona 500
20 years after its Daytona 500 broadcast, CBS used at least 200 people and more than 80 cameras for their coverage:
 33 in-car cameras - three cameras in 11 different cars.
 10 "pole" cameras above the pits.
 35 cameras around the track.
 A camera in a blimp.
 A camera with each of the three pit reporters.
 A camera in the booth.

CBS also planned to use more computerized graphics and a super slow-motion camera with a long lens.

Affiliation with The Nashville Network (TNN)

TNN had two self-operating and self-promoting sub-divisions, TNN Outdoors and TNN Motor Sports. TNN Outdoors was responsible for the programming of hunting and fishing shows; TNN Motor Sports was responsible for production of all the network's racing coverage, including NASCAR Winston Cup, Indy Racing League, and smaller outfits such as USAC, NHRA and ARCA. Motorcycle and speedboat racing was also broadcast. TNN Outdoors and TNN Motor Sports also marketed themselves, selling a variety of merchandise and licensing their brands for use on video games.

In 1995, the motorsports operations were moved to Concord, North Carolina into the industrial park located at Charlotte Motor Speedway, where TNN had purchased controlling interest in motorsports production company World Sports Enterprises. Among TNN personalities from the motorsports operation were Mike Joy, Eli Gold, Buddy Baker, Neil Bonnett, Randy Pemberton, Ralph Sheheen, Dick Berggren and Rick Benjamin.

Westinghouse Electric Corporation, which at the time owned the CBS networks and had an existing relationship with TNN through its Group W division, purchased TNN and its sister network CMT outright in 1995 to form CBS Cable (along with the short-lived startup network Eye On People).

Most of the original entertainment-oriented programming ceased production, and the network began to rely more on TNN Outdoors and TNN Motor Sports for programming. The network's ties to CBS allowed it to pick up country-themed dramas from the 1980s that originally aired on the broadcast network such as The Dukes of Hazzard and Dallas, neither of which had been seen on television since their original runs ended, and also allowed it to serve as an overflow feed for CBS Sports broadcasts, which happened during a NASCAR Busch Series race at Texas Motor Speedway in 1999 (though the network was a center of controversy by not airing the following year's second-tier race at Texas following a rain delay) and also during a PGA Tour event at Firestone Country Club. The 1998 Pepsi 400 was also moved to TNN when the race was postponed from the then-traditional July date to October 17, 1998, as a result of the 1998 Florida wildfires.

The end of NASCAR on CBS (2000)
NASCAR wanted to capitalize on its increased popularity at the start of the 21st century, so the organization decided that future television deals would be centralized; that is, the networks would negotiate directly with NASCAR for a regular schedule of telecasts. That deal was struck on December 15, 1999. The old deal arrangement saw each track negotiate with the networks to broadcast their races. As a result, NASCAR had races on CBS, TNN, ESPN, ABC, NBC and TBS.  ESPN and its parent network ABC broadcast the most races during the 2000 season (18).  TNN had the second most (8, plus the All-Star Race, then known as The Winston), followed by CBS (4, plus the Busch Clash and 125-mile qualifying races for the Daytona 500), TBS (3), and NBC, who covered just one Cup race and had only joined the ranks the year before with the inaugural race at Homestead-Miami Speedway.

With many tracks now falling under the ownership of either the France-family led International Speedway Corporation or the Bruton Smith led Speedway Motorsports, it was much easier for consolidated television packages to be negotiated.  NASCAR wanted to increase the number of races by each partner, and have as many races on broadcast networks as possible, to prevent fans from missing races.

The first consolidated TV deal was struck on December 15, 1999.

Under the new deal,, Fox Sports, FX, NBC and TBS (later moved to TNT) agreed to pay $2.4 billion for a new six-year package, covering the Winston Cup (now NASCAR Cup) Series and Busch (now Xfinity) Series schedules.
 Fox and FX would televise the first 16 races of the 2001, 2003 and 2005 seasons and races 2 through 17 of the 2002, 2004 and 2006 seasons. Fox would air the Daytona 500 in the odd-numbered years. All Busch Series races during that part of the season would also be on Fox/FX.
 NBC and TNT would televise the final 17 races of the even-numbered years as well as the Daytona 500 and the last 18 races of the odd-numbered years, as well as all Busch Series races held in that time of the year.

CBS also had broadcasting rights to college and NFL football, college basketball and golf, therefore scheduling conflicts prevented them to air as many races as NASCAR wanted. As a result, NASCAR's relationship with CBS, its oldest television partner, concluded at the end of the 2000 NASCAR Winston Cup Series. While the 2000 Pepsi 400 was the last Winston Cup Series race to be broadcast on CBS, their true final NASCAR race in general was the Craftsman Truck Series' Chevy Silverado 200, broadcast on July 15, 2000.

In June 2021, CBS Sports chairman Sean McManus reiterated that viewers shouldn't expect for the network to bid on any NASCAR broadcasting rights in the foreseeable future, due to in large part to its heavy commitment to golf.

Ratings

The television ratings for the Daytona 500 have surpassed those of the Indianapolis 500 since 1995, even though the 1995 race was available in fewer homes than in the past. CBS had lost affiliates in several major markets as a result of a realignment in the wake of Fox landing the broadcast television rights to the National Football Conference of the NFL, and was actually not available in a NASCAR Busch Series market, Milwaukee; that city's new CBS affiliate, WDJT-TV, was not available to some Southeastern Wisconsin cable providers.

On-air staff

Former commentators
 Buddy Baker – color commentator (1996–2000)
 Dick Berggren – pit reporter (1994–2000) 
 Neil Bonnett – color commentator (1990–1993)
 Dave Despain – pit reporter (1987–1991)
 Chris Economaki – color commentator/pit reporter (1984–1994)
 Eli Gold – lap-by-lap commentator
 Jerry Glanville – analyst
 Greg Gumbel – anchor (1999 Daytona 500 and Pepsi 400 only) (1999)
 David Hobbs – color commentator/pit reporter (1979-1996) 
 Ned Jarrett – pit reporter (1979-1984) / color commentator (1984-2000)
 Mike Joy – pit reporter (1983–1997) / lap-by-lap commentator (1997–2000) (Now with Fox Sports) 
 Randy Pemberton – pit reporter (covered pit road for the 1992 DieHard 500 at Talladega)
 Richard Petty – color commentator (1994-1995)
 Ralph Sheheen – pit reporter (1997-2000)
 Bill Stephens – pit reporter (1997-2000)
 Ken Squier – lap-by-lap announcer (1979–1997) / studio anchor beginning with the 1997 DieHard 500 at Talladega. (1997–2000)
 Darrell Waltrip – color commentator (NASCAR Craftsman Truck Series races, 1995 & 1997 Busch Clash's, and 1999 Bud Shootout only) (now with Fox Sports)
 Brock Yates – pit reporter (1979-1982)

References

External links

rec.autos.sport.nascar

World Sports Enterprises to Cease Production Operations

CBS Sports
CBS
CBS original programming
1970s American television series
1980s American television series
1990s American television series
1960 American television series debuts
2000 American television series endings
CBS Sports Spectacular